The Droid Incredible 4G LTE, also known as the HTC Incredible 4G or Incredible 3, is a smartphone designed and manufactured by Taiwan's HTC Corporation that runs the Android 4.0 operating system (ICS). Officially announced by Verizon on May 7, 2012, for CTIA, and released on July 5, 2012, through Verizon Wireless for $149.99 with a new two-year contract. The Droid Incredible 4G LTE is the successor to the HTC Incredible S.

Hardware 
The Droid Incredible 4G LTE has a 4-inch qHD (540x960) Super LCD display, a dual core 1.2 GHz Qualcomm Snapdragon S4 processor with 1 GB of RAM, an 8 MP auto-focus camera with LED flash, a 0.3 MP front-facing camera, and a 1700 mAh battery.

Software 
The Droid Incredible 4G LTE, at launch, ran Android 4.0.4 (Ice Cream Sandwich), with HTC's Sense 4.1 user interface. However, since launch, the latest available software for this phone is Android 4.4.4 (Kit Kat).

See also 
 HTC Rezound
 HTC One series
 Galaxy Nexus
 Comparison of smartphones

References 

HTC mobile phones
Android (operating system) devices
Discontinued smartphones